Gen. Nyaung-U Hpi (also spelt as Nyong Oo Phee or Nyaung U Bhi), also known as Nga Phee, was a leading general in King Anawrahta's Royal Army. He was well known as a great swimmer, and later became famous as one of the Four Paladins of Anawrahta.

His great-granddaughter was one of the three chief queens of King Naratheinkha (r. 1168–1171), with the title of Taung Pyinthi. His great-grandson Nadaungmya was made chief justice by King Narapatisithu (r. 1174–1211). His descendant Yazathingyan was the chief minister of kings Kyaswa, Uzana and Narathihapate.

References

Bibliography
 
 

Burmese generals